Randi Leinan (9 April 1968) is a former Norwegian football player and World Champion. 

She played on the Norwegian team that won the 1995 FIFA Women's World Cup in Sweden.

References

1968 births
Living people
Norwegian women's footballers
Norway women's international footballers
1995 FIFA Women's World Cup players
FIFA Women's World Cup-winning players
Toppserien players
SK Trondheims-Ørn players
Kolbotn Fotball players
Women's association football forwards